Armanian (also Romanized as Armanīān; also known as Ermashan) is a village in Peyghan Chayi Rural District, in the Central District of Kaleybar County, East Azerbaijan Province, Iran. At the 2006 census, its population was 59, in 18 families.

References 

Populated places in Kaleybar County